Jack Shepherd (born 29 October 1940) is an English actor, playwright and theatre director. He is known for his television roles, most notably the title role in Trevor Griffiths' series about a young Labour MP Bill Brand (1976), and the detective drama Wycliffe (1993–1998). His film appearances include All Neat in Black Stockings (1969), Wonderland (1999) and The Golden Compass (2007). He won the 1983 Olivier Award for Best Actor in a New Play for the original production of Glengarry Glen Ross.

Biography

Early life
Shepherd attended Roundhay School in Leeds and then studied fine art at Kings College, Newcastle University. During his time in Newcastle he was an amateur actor with the People's Theatre. After gaining a BA he went on to study acting, first at the Central School of Speech and Drama and then as a student founder of the Drama Centre London.

Shepherd married Judy Harland; they had two children together before divorcing. In 1975, he married Ann Scott, a television and film producer, with whom he had three further children, including Catherine Shepherd.

Career
Shepherd worked at the Royal Court Theatre from 1965 to 1969, making his first appearance on the London stage as an Officer of Dragoons in Serjeant Musgrave's Dance. In July 1967 he played Arnold Middleton in David Storey's The Restoration of Arnold Middleton, which transferred to the Criterion Theatre, a performance for which he received the Plays and Players London Critics' Award as most promising actor of the year. In 1969 he starred in the satirical comedy series World in Ferment.

During the 1970s, Shepherd appeared in many television dramas, including several appearances in the series Budgie (1971–72). In Ready When You Are, Mr McGill (1976) by Jack Rosenthal he played a television director struggling to maintain his composure during a doomed location shoot, and in Trevor Griffiths's Thames TV series Bill Brand (also 1976) a radical Labour MP. Both performances gained Shepherd Royal Television Society (RTS) Awards. He appeared as Renfield in Count Dracula (1977), with Louis Jourdan in the title role.

Shepherd also spent the decade running a drama studio in Kentish Town, north London along with fellow actor Richard Wilson, and during that time became interested in scriptwriting. He devised several plays for the theatre including The Sleep of Reason, Real Time, Clapperclaw and Half Moon.

In 1972, Shepherd was a founding member, along with Ian McKellen and Edward Petherbridge, of the democratically run Actors' Company, playing Vasques in 'Tis Pity She's a Whore, Inspector of Police in Ruling the Roost (Edinburgh Festival and tour) and Okano in The Three Arrows at the Arts, Cambridge in October 1972. In December 1972 he played Ben in David Mercer's Let's Murder Vivaldi at The King's Head Theatre, and in January 1973 took the title role in  Dracula at the Bush Theatre, also collaborating in the writing.

His television work in the 1970s included All Good Men, Through the Night and Occupations, all by Trevor Griffiths.

From 1977 to 1985 he was a member of Bill Bryden's Cottesloe Theatre Company at the National Theatre, playing Teach in American Buffalo, Judas in The Passion, Boamer in Lark Rise, Thomas Clarkeson in The World Turned Upside Down, Smitty in The Long Voyage Home, The Correspondent in Dispatches and Hickey in The Iceman Cometh. Shepherd originated the stage role of Richard Roma in Glengarry Glen Ross at the Cottesloe in 1983, for which he received a Society of West End Theatre award (later known as the Laurence Olivier Awards) as Actor of the Year in a New Play.

Shepherd's first written work for the stage was In Lambeth, an imaginary conversation about revolution between the poet and artist William Blake, his wife Catherine and Thomas Paine, author of The Rights of Man. He first directed it at the Partisan Theatre in July 1989 before its transfer to the Donmar Warehouse, winning the 1989 Time Out Awards for Best Directing and Best Writing.
 
Shepherd's work in television during the 1980s and 1990s included Blind Justice, a miniseries by Peter Flannery, and culminated in his acclaimed role as the eponymous Detective Superintendent Charles Wycliffe in the HTV television series Wycliffe from 1993 to 1998. He appeared as Butler the Butler in the 1996 television miniseries Over Here.

As a theatre director, Shepherd has staged several productions at the Shakespeare's Globe, including his 'Prologue Production' of The Two Gentlemen of Verona, starring Mark Rylance as Proteus, which opened the Globe to the theatregoing public in August 1996, a year before the formal opening Gala. In 1998 at the Globe he played Antonio in Richard Olivier's production of The Merchant of Venice.

Shepherd's epic drama about the Chartist movement, Holding Fire! was commissioned by the Shakespeare's Globe Theatre as part of its Renaissance and Revolution season, and was first staged there by Mark Rosenblatt in August 2007.

He played the part of the Father in Rupert Goold's production of Six Characters in Search of an Author in 2009, the Doctor in The Master Builder at the Almeida, and Melchior, one of the Magi, in the four-part TV drama The Nativity, broadcast on BBC One in December 2010.

He played Ralph Palmer (from a 1980s case) in the 2011 episode "Solidarity” of TV series Waking the Dead.  In 2013 he played Harry in "Home" by David Storey at the Arcola Theatre and Joe in the BBC TV seriesThe Politician's Husband.  In 2014 Serebryakov in "Uncle Vanya at the St James Theatre. Also in 2014/15 he toured in three ghost stories, Whistle and I'll Come to You, and The Signalman for Middleground Theatre Company, and in 2015/6 with the same company he toured in a stage adaptation of the film The Verdict. 2017/2018 he played Art Hockstadder in Gore Vidal's play The Best Man, first on tour and then at the Playhouse Theatre London.

Shepherd's interest in community theatre led to adaptations of Dorian Gray and of Hardy's Under the Greenwood Tree for the Players Collective in Lewes. His version of the latter was performed by the Hardy Players in Dorchester in  December 2016.

He has written and directed a new play, The Cutting Edge, which was due to run in 2020.

Plays
Plays by Jack Shepherd include:
The Incredible Journey of Sir Francis Younghusband (Royal Court Upstairs)
The Sleep of Reason (Traverse Theatre, Edinburgh) 1973
Clapperclaw (BBC Two) 1981
Real Time (directed and devised with the Joint Stock Theatre Company) 1982
Revelations (Bridge Lane, London) 1983s.
In Lambeth (Partisan Theatre and Donmar Warehouse) 1989. Published by Methuen. 
Comic Cuts (Derby Playhouse, Salisbury Theatre and Lyric Studio, Hammersmith) 1995
Chasing the Moment  (Southwark Playhouse) 1994 and (BAC1 London) 1995 dir. Janos Bruck, (revived Arcola, Dalston) 2007 dir. Mehmet Ergen. Published by First Write
Half Moon (Southwark Playhouse) 1998
Through a Cloud (Birmingham Rep and Drum, Plymouth) 2004), revived Arcola) 2005. Published by Nick Hern Books.
Man Falling Down: A Mask Play (devised and co-written with Oliver Cotton, Shakespeare's Globe) 2005
Holding Fire! (Shakespeare's Globe) 2007. Published by Nick Hern Books
 The Cutting Edge 2020

Co-wrote with Keith Dewhurst Impossible Plays, an account of his years in Bill Bryden's Cottesloe Company at the National Theatre. Published by Methuen.

His two recently completed plays are Against the Tide, about William Morris, and The Valley of the Shadow, about World War I.

Filmography

Two and Two Make Six (1962) .... Grand Hotel Night Receptionist (uncredited)
All Neat in Black Stockings (1969) .... Dwyer
The Bed Sitting Room (1969) .... Under Water Vicar
The Virgin Soldiers (1969) .... Sergeant Wellbeloved
Special Branch (1969) .... Peter Watson
The Last Valley (1971) .... Eskesen
Budgie (1971, TV Series) .... PC Donnelly
Something to Hide (1972) .... Joe Pepper
Ready When You Are, Mr. McGill (1976, TV Series) - Phil Parish - Director
Count Dracula (1977, TV Movie) .... Renfield
The Devil's Crown (1978, TV Series) .... Thomas Becket
Scoop (1987, TV Movie) .... The Journey - Corker
Escape from Sobibor (1987, TV Movie) .... Itzhak Lichtman
Body Contact (1987) .... Dickie Finn
Lights and Shadows (1988)
Murderers Among Us: The Simon Wiesenthal Story (1989, TV Movie) .... Brodi
Ball Trap on the Cote Sauvage (1989, TV Movie) .... Joe Marriot
Shoot to Kill (1990, TV Movie) .... John Stalker
The Big Man (1990) .... Referee
Crimestrike (1990)
The Object of Beauty (1991) .... Mr. Slaughter
Twenty-One (1991) .... Kenneth
Blue Ice (1992) .... Stevens
Blue Black Permanent (1992) .... Philip Lomax
Wycliffe (1993–1998, TV Series) .... Det. Supt. Wycliffe
No Escape (1994) .... Dysart
Over Here (1996, TV Movie) .... Butler
The Scarlet Tunic (1998) .... Dr. Edward Grove
Wonderland (1999) .... Bill
The Martins (2001) .... DI Tony Branch
Charlotte Gray (2001) .... Paul Pichon
Silent Witness episode Closed Ranks (2002) .... ACC Richard Dyer
Boudica (2003) .... Claudius
A Cock and Bull Story (Tristram Shandy) (2005) .... Surgeon
Lipstick (2005, Short) .... Man
All About George (2005, TV Series) .... Gordon Kinsey
A Dad from Christmas (2006, TV Movie) .... Bert
The Golden Compass (2007) .... Master
God on Trial (2008, TV Movie) .... Khun
Thorne (2010, TV series) .... Jim Thorne
The Nativity (2010, TV Mini-Series) .... Melchior
The Politician's Husband (2013, TV Mini-Series) .... Joe Hoynes
Greyhawk (2014) .... Howard
New Tricks (2014, TV Series) .... William Taskerland
Midsomer Murders (2015, TV Series) .... Magnus Soane
Manhunt : The Night Stalker, Part 2 (2021, TV Series) .... Dave Sutton

Further reading
Impossible Plays: Adventures With the Cottesloe Company by Keith Dewhurst and Jack Shepherd, Methuen Drama (2006)

References
Who's Who in the Theatre. 17th edition, Gale Publishing (1981) 
Halliwell's Film Guide
Halliwell's Who's Who in the Movies
Theatre Record indexes

External links

Theatrical agent

1940 births
Male actors from Leeds
Alumni of Newcastle University
English male television actors
English male stage actors
English male radio actors
English dramatists and playwrights
English television writers
English theatre directors
English male Shakespearean actors
Royal Shakespeare Company members
Living people
Alumni of the Royal Central School of Speech and Drama
Alumni of the Drama Centre London
People educated at Roundhay School
English male writers
British male dramatists and playwrights
Laurence Olivier Award winners
British male television writers